Prodromus Entomology is one of the earliest books about Australian natural history, and the first book about Australia containing plates engraved in Australia.  The full title of the first edition is Prodromus Entomology. Natural History of Lepidopterous Insects of New South Wales, collected, engraved and faithfully painted after nature.

History
The author and illustrator, John William Lewin, travelled from England to the new British settlement of New South Wales in 1799 (arriving in January 1800), becoming the colony’s first professional artist.  His journey was sponsored by wealthy amateur entomologist Dru Drury, who was to be repaid with specimens of new insects.  Despite initial delays and distractions, Lewin began his investigations of the natural history in the general vicinity of Sydney, eventually producing illustrated books on moths and birds, of which the Prodromus was the first.

First edition
The Prodromus was published in 1805 in London.  The first edition contains 18 colour plates of moths found in the vicinity of Sydney, with accompanying descriptive and scientific text, with which Lewin was considerably assisted in the identification and classification of the species depicted, by entomologist Alexander Macleay.  The moths are shown accurately with the food plants of their larvae, from which they were cultured by the author.  Lewin etched the copper plates for the illustrations in Australia and then sent them to his brother Thomas in London for printing.  The book was offered for subscription at varying prices for different qualities of plate colouring, and issued in imperial quarto, medium quarto and demy quarto sizes.  It was dedicated to The Right Honourable Lady Arden.  In the preface Thomas Lewin says:
”The contents of this little Volume are Lepidopterous Insects, indigenous of New South Wales, were there collected, painted, and engraved, by the Author; and sent to London by him for publication, to furnish him with the means of returning to England, his native country, after an absence of near eight years, which he has spent almost solely in the pursuit of natural history, principally in the branches, Ornithology and Entomology; in which he has in New South Wales, and in Otaheite, made some hundred of original paintings; from which it is hoped he may, by the profits of this little first effort, be enabled to return and reap an honourable benefit, as their publication, under his ingenious hand, we flatter ourselves, would somewhat redound to the honour, reputation, and increase of those branches of the sciences in Britain.  The insects here figured are new, and some of them extraordinary in their natural history, the singularity of which, with the correctness of the figures, must render this Work, we conceive, particularly valuable.  For till this author, none has discovered, or expected to find lepidopterous insects of the families here figured, as the destroyers of timber, or the depredators of massy and hardest trees, in the way which is here made known.  And it should be observed also, that the natural history, as well as the engraving, was done on the spot, and not from dry specimens, or notes still more abstruse.”

Later editions
After Lewin’s death in Sydney in 1819 and his wife’s return to England, a second edition of the book was issued in demy quarto format, including an additional plate as a frontispiece, with the full title reduced to Natural History of the Lepidopterous Insects of New South Wales, painted after nature.  The date on the title page is 1822, though many issues of the second edition were not printed until later, some as late as 1827.

A third, facsimile, edition was published in 2007 by Gaston Renard of Melbourne, limited to 212 copies in the Edition Renard series.  As well as the text and illustrations of the early editions, it contains historical, bibliographical and publication notes, a list of the current scientific names of the moths depicted, an appendix with a table indicating the ownership and whereabouts of known surviving copies of the early editions, with acknowledgements to those assisting with the bibliographic research.

The Prodromus, in both its first and second editions, is a bibliographic rarity.  Julien Renard comments:
”A survey of auction records since 1896 reveals ten copies of the 1805 edition of which five are explicitly identified in later collections represented in the table.  Bookseller’s records available to me indicate a possible further four copies, making a maximum total of thirty-four copies of the first edition (in all forms) identified or identifiable.  Similarly, auction records show twenty-two possibly distinct copies of the 1822 edition of which one is positively identified in the table and bookseller’s records indicate a possible four additional copies, making a maximum total of fifty copies of the second edition identified or identifiable.  There are undoubtedly at least several more copies in private hands and still others as yet unidentified in institutional collections, but this survey gives some indication of the absolute rarity of the work.”

See also
 John Lewin

References

Notes

Sources
 
 

1805 non-fiction books
1822 non-fiction books
2007 non-fiction books
Fine illustrated books
Books about Australian natural history
Books on Lepidoptera